Rytidosperma bipartitum, the leafy wallaby grass, is a perennial species of grass found in south eastern Australia. Usually found on the heavier clay or on loamy soils in open eucalyptus woodland. The habit is somewhat variable, erect and densely tufted.

References

bipartitum
Bunchgrasses of Australasia
Flora of New South Wales
Flora of Queensland
Flora of Victoria (Australia)
Flora of South Australia
Poales of Australia
Plants described in 2010